Jacques J.A. Asselin is a Canadian former diplomat. He was concurrently the Ambassador Extraordinary and Plenipotentiary to Cape Verde, Guinea, Guinea-Bissau, Mauritania and Senegal and High Commissioner to The Gambia. He was also Ambassador Extraordinary and Plenipotentiary to Belgium and to Luxembourg.

External links 

 Foreign Affairs and International Trade Canada Complete List of Posts 

Year of birth missing (living people)
Living people
High Commissioners of Canada to the Gambia
Ambassadors of Canada to Guinea
Ambassadors of Canada to Guinea-Bissau
Ambassadors of Canada to Mauritania
Ambassadors of Canada to Senegal
Ambassadors of Canada to Belgium
Ambassadors of Canada to Luxembourg